Richard L. Yow (born October 28, 1974) is an American politician. He is a member of the South Carolina House of Representatives from the 53rd District, serving since 2014. He is a member of the Republican party.

References

Living people
1974 births
Republican Party members of the South Carolina House of Representatives
21st-century American politicians